Tegenaria abchasica is a spider species found in Russia and Georgia.

Description
Tegenaria abchasica differs from all other known species in the genus Tegenaria by the presence of two dark spots on the upper surface of the cephalothorax at the junction of the head and thorax. There is also a characteristic pattern on the under surface of the cephalothorax, consisting of a paler central line with a pair of lighter spots on either side (sometimes more than one pair). The male is somewhat smaller, particularly the abdomen. The legs have yellow femora with four dark gray-green half rings, yellow patellae, darkened distally (away from the body); yellow tibiae with three half rings coloured as the femora; and brown metatarsi, also with three similar half rings.

Males appear to live only a year, maturing in August and September and dying in the winter; females hibernate.

Taxonomy
Tegenaria abchasica was first described in 1941 by D.E. Charitonov. Initially only the male was known; the female was first described in 2008.

Distribution and habitat
Tegenaria abchasica is known from Krasnodar Krai in Russia and neighbouring Abkhazia in Georgia. First found in caves in Abkhazia, in Russia it was found in more open habitats (yew-boxwood woodland).

See also 
 List of Agelenidae species

References

External links 

abchasica
Spiders of Europe
Spiders of Georgia (country)
Spiders of Russia
Spiders described in 1941